Several ships of the Royal Navy have borne the name HMS Paladin:

  was a tender-tug hired  as a rescue tug between 1914 and 1919; she was renamed Paladin II in 1916 when the destroyer was commissioned
  was a P-class destroyer and later a Type 16 frigate, in commission 1941 - 1962

References

Royal Navy ship names